Gérald Laroche (born 1964) is a French actor born in Paris, France. He is an actor and composer known for his roles in Maléfique (2002), The Last Deadly Mission (2008) and Love Crime (2010).

Filmography
1989 : Hiver 54, l'abbé Pierre de Denis Amar : Clovis
1990 : Faux et usage de faux de Laurent Heynemann : l'assistant
1993 : La Nage indienne de Xavier Durringer : Max
1995 : Au petit Marguery de Laurent Bénégui : Paul
1997 : Romaine de Agnès Obadia : Armand
1997 : J'irai au paradis car l'enfer est ici de Xavier Durringer : Rufin
1999 : Cantique de la racaille de Vincent Ravalec
2001 : Trois huit de Philippe Le Guay : Pierre
2001 : J'ai tué Clémence Acéra de Jean-Luc Gaget : Paul Alimi
2002 : Gangsters de Olivier Marchal : Marc Jansen
2003 : Maléfique d' Éric Valette : Carrère
2003 : Fanfan la Tulipe de Gérard Krawczyk : Corsini
2003 : Qui perd gagne! de Laurent Bénégui : l'employé du casino
2004 : A ce soir de Laure Duthilleul : René
2005 : La Boîte noire de Richard Berry : Koskas
2005 : Michou d'Auber de Thomas Gilou : Robert
2006 : La Jungle de Mathieu Delaporte : le psychiatre
2006 : The Serpent de Eric Barbier : Becker
2007 : Le Dernier Voyage, court métrage de Frédéric Duvin : Rivière
2007 : Le Deuxième souffle d' Alain Corneau : Chef
2007 : The Last Deadly Mission d' Olivier Marchal : Georges Matéo
2007 : Nos retrouvailles de David Oelhoffen : Krosiki
2007 : J'ai toujours rêvé d'être un gangster de Samuel Benchetrit : le patron
2008 : Les insoumis de Claude-Michel Rome : Abel Vargas
2008 : Dante 01 de Marc Caro : Charon
2009 : Demain dès l'aube de Denis Dercourt : Rogart
2009 : Une affaire d'État d' Éric Valette : Christophe Bonfils
2010 : Love Crime d' Alain Corneau : Gérard
2012 : Une nuit de Philippe Lefebvre : Alex

References

External links

French male film actors
1964 births
Living people